Immunoscreening is a method of biotechnology used to detect a polypeptide produced from a cloned gene. The term encompasses several different techniques designed for protein identification, such as Western blotting, using recombinant DNA, and analyzing antibody-peptide interactions.

Clones are screened for the presence of the gene product: the resulting protein.
This strategy requires first that a gene library is implemented in an expression vector, and that antiserum to the protein is available.
Radioactivity or an enzyme is coupled generally with the secondary
antibody.
The radioactivity/enzyme linked secondary antibody can be purchased commercially and can detect different antigens.
In commercial diagnostics labs, labelled primary antibodies are
also used. The antigen-antibody interaction is used in the immunoscreening of several diseases.

See also
ELISA
Blots

References

Biotechnology